Parminder Singh (born on 6 February 2000 at Yamunanagar in Haryana, India) is an Indian rower.
 
Parminder Singh is the son of former Indian rower Inderpal Singh. He primarily competes in single scull events.

In 2019 at the Asian Indoor Rowing Championship, Bangkok he made a new Asian record in the Men's single scull event with the timimg of 06.12.4, winning the gold medal in the event. In 2021 at the World Indoor Rowing Championship he finished in 6th position clocking the timimg of 06.06.9 and setting a new national record and Asian record.

Major Events

References

Living people
2000 births
Indian male rowers